Cyanarctia is a genus of moths in the family Erebidae. The genus was erected by George Hampson in 1901.

Species
 Cyanarctia dama Druce, 1894
 Cyanarctia flavinigra Dognin, 1910
 Cyanarctia percurrens Warren, 1905

References

Pericopina